USS Edward C. Daly (DE-17) was an Evarts-class "short-hull" destroyer escort in the service of the United States Navy.

Namesake
Edward Carlyle Daly was born on 27 April 1914 at Pink Hill, North Carolina. He enlisted in the U.S. Navy as an apprentice seaman, for a period of four years, on 13 February 1934 at the Navy Recruiting Station, Raleigh, North Carolina and was transferred to the Naval Station, Norfolk, Virginia, the same day. Rated a seaman second class on 13 June 1934, he joined the heavy cruiser  on 27 June and on 27 May 1936, was advanced in rate to seaman first class. Transferred to the transport  on 17 June, he was received at the Receiving Station, Naval Operating Base (NOB), Norfolk on 13 July. Transferred to the Norfolk Navy Yard, Portsmouth, Virginia, on 11 September, he was transferred again, to the new destroyer  on 15 January 1937.

Daly received a Good Conduct Medal on 26 February 1938, and extended his enlistment for two years to expire on 26 February 1940. Rated Coxswain while serving on Downes, on 16 February 1940, he received an honorable discharge at that rate on 23 February, but reenlisted the next day on board the destroyer to serve a period of four years. Outside of a tour of duty in destroyer tender  (27 May 1940 – 1 March 1941), Daly spent the remainder of his time in the naval service on the Downes.

On 7 December 1941, during the Attack on Pearl Harbor Downes lay in Dry Dock No. 1 at the Pearl Harbor Navy Yard, next to its sister ship  and ahead of the battleship . Badly damaged by Japanese bombs and set ablaze, Downes was soon abandoned. Coxswain Daly sought to save a badly wounded shipmate after an oil fire forced the abandonment of the forward part of the ship, but died in the attempt. He was posthumously awarded the Navy Cross.

Construction and commissioning
Edward C. Daly was launched on 21 October 1942 by Mare Island Navy Yard, Solano County, California as HMS Byard (BDE-17); sponsored for British Lend-Lease by the wife of Lieutenant John H. McQuilkin, but retained by the USN and assigned the name Edward C. Daly on 19 February 1943; and commissioned on 3 April 1943.

Service history

World War II
Edward C. Daly sailed from San Diego, California on 22 May 1943 and arrived at Pearl Harbor on 28 May. As the first escort vessel to visit this base, she aroused much interest and was visited by Admirals Chester W. Nimitz and Raymond A. Spruance. She escorted convoys between Pearl Harbor and the west coast. In August, she went to Funafuti to occupy other parts of the Ellice Islands and succeeded against slight opposition.

While fueling at Samoa early in October, she rescued the crew of a downed patrol bomber in heavy seas, destroyed the plane, and buried the pilot at sea.

Edward C. Daly returned to San Francisco for repairs and got underway for Alaskan waters on 27 November. Here she was assigned to the demanding, essential duty as guard and weather ship for planes flying the great circle route from Attu to Paramushiro.

She returned to San Francisco on 19 January 1945 for overhaul, then headed for Saipan, escorting  as far as Guam. She was active in air-sea rescue between Iwo Jima and Saipan, continuing this patrol after the war for planes supporting the occupation of Japan.

On 19 October 1945, Edward C. Daly returned to the United States, was decommissioned at San Pedro, Los Angeles on 20 December 1945, and sold on 8 January 1947.

Awards

References

External links

NavSource Online: Destroyer Escort Photo Archive - USS Edward C. Daly (DE-17)

Evarts-class destroyer escorts
World War II frigates and destroyer escorts of the United States
Ships built in Vallejo, California
1942 ships